Autoimmune autonomic ganglionopathy (AAG) is a rare form of dysautonomia in which the immune system produces ganglionic anti-nicotinic acetylcholine receptor (AChR) antibodies, inhibiting ganglionic AChR currents and impairing transmission in autonomic ganglia. Symptoms onset can be acute, subacute or gradual.

Signs and symptoms 
Although symptoms of AAG can vary from patient to patient, symptoms are dysautonomia. Hallmarks include:
 Gastrointestinal dysmotility, including lack of appetite, nausea, constipation, diarrhea
 Anhidrosis (decreased ability to sweat), often preceded by excessive sweating
 Bladder dysfunction (neurogenic bladder)
 Small fiber peripheral neuropathy
 Severe orthostatic hypotension
 Pupillary dysfunction
 Syncope (fainting)
 Sicca syndrome (chronic dryness of the eyes and mouth) See: 
 No indication from the history or physical examination of cerebellar, striatal, pyramidal, and extrapyramidal dysfunction, as these features suggest the more serious multiple system atrophy.

Causes 
The cause is generally either paraneoplastic syndrome or idiopathic. In idiopathic AAG, the body's own immune system targets a receptor in the autonomic ganglia, which is part of a peripheral nerve fiber. If the AAG is paraneoplastic, they have a form of cancer, and their immune system has produced paraneoplastic antibodies in response to the cancer.

Diagnosis 
Traditional autonomic testing is used to aid in the diagnosis of AAG. These tests can include a tilt table test (TTT), thermoregulatory sweat test (TST), quantitative sudomotor autonomic reflex testing (QSART) and various blood panels. Additionally, a blood test showing high levels of the antibody ganglionic nicotenic acetylcholine receptor (gAChr) occur in about 50% of patients with AAG (seropositive AAG). The seronegative patients (those without detectable gAChR levels) are theorized to have one or more different antibodies responsible for the autonomic dysfunction. However, both seropositive and seronegative patients have been seen to respond to the same treatments. A paraneoplastic panel may also be ordered to rule out paraneoplastic syndrome.

Treatment 
Where an underlying neoplasm is the cause, treatment of this condition is indicated in order to reduce progression of symptoms. For cases without a known cause, treatment involves suppression of the immune system with corticosteroid treatment, intravenous immunoglobulin,  immunosuppressive agents like rituximab, mycophenolate mofetil (Cellcept), or azathioprine (Imuran) or plasmapheresis.

See also 
 Myasthenia gravis
 Dysautonomia
 Postural orthostatic tachycardia syndrome
 Multiple system atrophy

References

External links 

Channelopathies
Peripheral nervous system disorders
Autonomic ganglia
Autoimmune diseases